Volker Bertelmann (born 1966) is a German pianist and composer who mainly performs and records under the name Hauschka. He is best known for his compositions for prepared piano. He won an Academy Award and a British Academy Film Award for his work on All Quiet on the Western Front (2022).

Early life 
Volker Bertelmann was born in Kreuztal, Germany. He grew up in the village of Ferndorf in the district of Siegen-Wittgenstein, North Rhine-Westphalia. The fifth of six children, he discovered piano playing at the age of nine at church service. He began studying classical piano and continued taking lessons for the next ten years.

Bertelmann formed his first rock band when he was fourteen. During the following years he was commissioned to compose music for television and sang in a number of other bands. After leaving school he moved to Cologne, where he began studying medicine and then switched to a course in business economics, but gave up both in order to concentrate on music.

Career

1992-2003: Early career 
In 1992, Hauschka and his cousin formed the hip-hop duo God’s Favorite Dog, who became known above all for their tracks Love and Pain and Sway. They released an album on Sony Music's Epic label and went on to perform nationally and internationally, among others as a support act for Die Fantastischen Vier. The duo split in 1995 to pursue other directions.

After a period of drifting, Bertelmann moved to Düsseldorf and started making music again, drawing on his years of classical piano training. He composed pieces for piano and released them under the alias Hauschka; he wanted to use an Eastern European-sounding pseudoym and found Bohemian composer Vincenz Hauschka as a reference.

2004-2006: Prepared piano beginnings 
The first Hauschka album Substantial was released in 2004 on the Cologne label Karaoke Kalk, followed in 2005 by The Prepared Piano on the same label. On this second album Bertelmann explored the possibilities of the prepared piano by wedging pieces of leather, felt or rubber between the piano strings, wrapping aluminium foil around the hammers, placing small objects on the strings or joining them together with guitar strings or adhesive tape.

2007-2010: Room to Expand, Ferndorf and Foreign Landscapes 
In 2007 Bertelmann signed a recording contract with 130701, an imprint of FatCat Records, through which his album Ferndorf was released in 2008.

Following a concert performance with the Magik*Magik Orchestra, Bertelmann decided to integrate other musical instruments into his compositions, and in January 2010 the resulting works were performed in San Francisco by an orchestra led by Minna Choi. With Ian Pellicci as the sound engineer, they were recorded in John Vanderslice's Tiny Telephone studio. Volker Bertelmann then recorded the piano tracks at Studio Zwei in Düsseldorf, and the album Foreign Landscapes was released on the 130701 label later that year.

2011-2014: Salon des Amateurs, Silfra and film score beginnings 

On his 2011 album Salon des Amateurs Bertelmann collaborated with notable musicians such as Samuli Kosminen (Múm, Edea), Jeffrey Zeigler (ex Kronos Quartet), Pekka Kusisto, The band Múm, Nik Bartsch, Henrik Schwarz and Hilary Hahn, as well as Calexico's Joey Burns and John Convertino. These recordings were originally intended as a joint release with Foreign Landscapes, whereby on the one hand the piano was going to be just one instrument among many, and on the other it was to be used primarily as a rhythm instrument. The recorded pieces did not fit together in the way Bertelmann had envisaged, however, so he decided to release the two albums separately. Foreign Landscapes represents a shift of focus away from the prepared piano as a solo instrument, while Salon des Amateurs signals a move towards a more strongly rhythmic approach.

The release of Salon des Amateurs was followed by the release of remix album Salon des Amateurs Remixes, which featured notable contributions by Michael Mayer, Matthew Herbert, Max Loderbauer & Ricardo Villalobos, Alva Noto and Steve Bicknell.

In May 2012 Silfra, a collaborative album with the American violinist Hilary Hahn, was released on Deutsche Grammophon. Named after the Silfra rift in Iceland, it consists of twelve improvisations by Bertelmann and Hahn that were recorded by Valgeir Sigurdsson at Greenhouse Studios in Reykjavík.

In 2012 Bertelmann wrote his first score for a feature film, entitled Glück, which was directed by Doris Dörrie.

2015 - Present: Lion, What If and commissioned works 
In 2015, Bertelmann was an artist-in-residence at the MDR Leipzig Radio Symphony Orchestra. He created three pieces for them, most notably his collaboration with Múm entitled ‘Drowning’, which they premiered at the Gewandhaus in Leipzig on June 27, 2015. In 2016, he was commissioned to create a piece for acclaimed cellist Nicholas Altstädt. The piece, Lost, premiered at Viva Cello in September 2016.

In 2016, Bertelmann collaborated with Dustin O'Halloran on the score for the Oscar-nominated film Lion. The score of the film was nominated for all major awards including the Academy Awards, Golden Globes, BAFTAs and Critics’ Choice Awards.

In 2017, he released solo album ‘What If’ on City Slang and Temporary Residence. The album explores the possibilities of his music, inspired by hip-hop, performed by fast and accurate player pianos. Bertelmann wrote two pieces for Avi Avital, called Flood and Drought, which premiered at the Schleswig-Holstein Musik Festival in July 2017.

In 2018, he composed the score for the film Adrift, which is based on the true story of a sailor stranded at sea after a storm. Adrift is directed by Baltasar Kormákur and stars Shailene Woodley and Sam Claflin. Hauschka stated, "Collaborating with Baltasar Kormákur was a wonderful experience and he gave me a lot of freedom to find the right sound for the film. Adrift tells a story about love and the fragility of human existence, so I wanted to create some sort of instrumental tension to reflect both the darkness and peril, as well as the lightness and love in this film. We ended up recording a full string orchestra at British Grove in London and added piano and experimental electronics to create a diverse and dynamic score. I'm very happy with the result, and I feel fortunate to have been part of this powerful film."

In 2019, he created the Hauschka Composer Toolkit sample library with Spitfire Audio, featuring many of his signature sounds.

2020 had him doing Netflix’s blockbuster movie of the summer, The Old Guard starring Charlize Theron, as well as Summerland with Gemma Arterton, Francis Lee’s romantic drama Ammonite, and the sci-fi movie Stowaway starring Anna Kendrick and Toni Collette.

In 2022, he scored All Quiet on the Western Front for Netflix, the official Best International Feature Film Oscar-entry for Germany, and War Sailor, both of which were official selections at the Toronto International Film Festival. For his work on the former, he won the Academy Award for Best Original Score and the BAFTA Award for Best Original Music.

Discography

Albums
 Substantial (2004)
 The prepared piano (2005)
 What a day (EP 2006)
 Room to Expand (2007)
 Versions of the Prepared Piano (2007)
 Ferndorf (2008)
 Snowflakes and Carwrecks (2008)
 Small Pieces (2009)
 Foreign Landscapes (2010)
 Salon Des Amateurs (2011)
 Salon Des Amateurs Remixes (2012)
 Youyoume (EP 2011)
 Pan Tone (EP 2011) with Hildur Guðnadóttir
 Silfra (2012) with Hilary Hahn
 Abandoned City (2014)
 5 Movements (EP 2016) with Dustin O'Halloran
 A NDO C Y (2015)
 What If (2017)
 A Different Forest (2019)
 Upstream (2021)

Soundtrack albums 
 The Boy (2015, Milan Records)
 Lion (2016, Sony Music)
 In Dubious Battle (2017, Lakeshore Records)
 Gunpowder (2017, Sony Music)
 1000 Arten Regen Zu Beschreiben (2018, Needlewood Records)
 Adrift (2018, Sony Classical)
 Hotel Mumbai (2019, Varèse Sarabande)
 The Art of Racing in the Rain (2019, Fox Music)
 Dublin Murders (2020, Needlewood Records)
 Summerland (2020, Needlewood Records) 
 The Old Guard (2020, Milan Records) 
 Schnee von gestern (2020, Needlewood Records) 
 Als Hitler das rosa Kaninchen stahl (2020, Needlewood Records) 
 Downhill (2020, Fox Music) 
 A Christmas Carol (2020, Hollywood Records) 
 Ammonite (2020, Milan Records)
 Stowaway (2021, Lakeshore Records)
 War Sailor (2022, Lakeshore Records)
 All Quiet on the Western Front (2022, Netflix Music, LLC)

Filmography

Films

Documentaries

Television

Awards and nominations

References

External links

 www.hauschka-net.de
 
 
 2010 NPR interview with Hauschka
 March 2014 NPR interview with Hauschka

1966 births
Best Original Music BAFTA Award winners
Living people
German pianists
German composers
German film score composers
21st-century pianists
Temporary Residence Limited artists
FatCat Records artists
City Slang artists
Best Original Music Score Academy Award winners